Old Fallings is a suburb of Wolverhampton, West Midlands, England.  It is north-east of Wolverhampton city centre, within the Fallings Park ward. It mostly consists of interwar council housing.

Areas of Wolverhampton